Jane Jamieson (born 23 June 1975) is a track and field athlete from Australia.

Jamieson has competed in the heptathlon in the Olympic Games, World Championships and Commonwealth Games, finishing with Top-10 results at each level, including a gold medal at the 2002 Commonwealth Games in Manchester.

Since the 2000 Olympic Games, Jamieson has been hampered by a string of knee, hamstring and calf injuries and missed the 2004 Olympic Games due to injury.

Jamieson returned from injury to qualify for the 2006 Commonwealth Games in Melbourne, but failed to complete the competition after suffering a calf strain to her left leg combining with the hamstring injury she suffered six weeks before the start of the Melbourne Games.

Despite the setbacks, Jamieson has signalled her desire to continue on to the 2008 Olympic Games in Beijing and the 2010 Commonwealth Games in New Delhi.

Career results

Australian championships

 High Jump: '98 – 3rd
 Long Jump: '98 – 2nd, '99 – 3rd
 Javelin: '99 – 1st
 Heptathlon: '93 – 1st (U18), '94 – 1st (U20), '95 – 1st, '96 – 1st, '98 – 1st, '01 – 1st, '02 – 4th, '06 – 2nd

International championships

 Commonwealth Games: '98 – Heptathlon – 2nd, '02 – Heptathlon – 1st, '06 – Heptathlon – DNF
 Olympic Games: '96 – Heptathlon – 20th, '00 – Heptathlon – 10th
 World Championships: '95 – Heptathlon – 14th, '99 – Heptathlon – DNF
 World Indoor Championships: '99 – Pentathlon – 5th
 World Junior Championships: '94 – Heptathlon – 10th
 World University Games: '95 – Heptathlon – 1st, '97 – DNF, '01- 1st, '03 – 2nd

Personal bests

 100m Hurdles – 1998 13.88
 200 metres – 1998 24.43
 800 metres – 1995 2:14.68
 Heptathlon – 1998 6354 points
 High Jump – 1995 1.86
 Javelin Throw – 1998 49.19
 Long Jump – 1998 6.47
 Shot Put – 1998 14.69

International championship results

 1994 World Junior Championships  Heptathlon 10/22 10th 5468pts (14.44(+1.9), 1.73m, 12.47m, 25.61(+0.3), 5.22m(+1.1), 39.94m, 2:18.08)
 1995 World Championships   Heptathlon 14/30 14th 6133pts (14.43(-0.3), 1.86m, 12.75m, 24.86(+0.8), 6.18m(+0.3), 45.04m, 2:15.84)
 1995 Universiade   Heptathlon 1/20 1st 6123pts (14.18(+0.3), 1.86m, 13.46m, 25.31(-0.9), 5.95m(-1.5), 45.24m, 2:14.68)
 1996 Olympic Games   Heptathlon 20/29 20th 5897pts (14.57(-0.9), 1.80m, 13.64m, 25.70(+0.9),5.93m(+0.8), 44.58m, 2:18.60)
 1997 Universiade   Heptathlon 23/23 Did not finish 3579pts (14.34(+1.6), 1.85m, 13.88m, 25.73, DNS)
 1998 Commonwealth Games   Heptathlon 2/10 2nd 6354pts (13.89(-0.2), 1.82, 14.36, 24.67(+0.1), 6.28(-0.1), 48.14m, 2:17.24)
 1999 World Indoor Championships   Pentathlon 5/8 5th 4490pts (8.66, 1.83m, 13.94m, 6.08m, 2:19.64)
 1999 World Championships   Heptathlon 22/22 Did not finish 2557pts (14.34(+0.3), 1.72m, 13.30m)
 2000 Olympic Games   Heptathlon 10/33 10th 6104pts (14.09(-0.2), 1.81m, 13.59m, 25.27(-0.6), 6.09m(+0.9), 45.32m, 2:16.57)
 2001 Universiade   Heptathlon 1/22 1st 6041pts (14.28, 1.82m, 13.57m, 25.48, 6.03m, 46.70m, 2:19.10)
 2002 Commonwealth Games   Heptathlon 1/10 1st 6059pts (14.44(-0.2), 1.86m, 13.73m, 25.13(+2.1), 5.84m(-0.4), 48.01m, 2:20.72)
 2002 World Cup   High Jump 9/9 9th 1.75m
 2003 Universiade   High Jump 16/16 Did not Start 
 2003 Universiade              Heptathlon 2/18 2nd 5908pts (14.36(+0.2), 1.82m, 13.38m, 25.97(-1.0), 5.89m(-0.3), 45.92m, 2:19.77)
 2006 Commonwealth Games   Heptathlon 11/11 Did not finish 4996pts (14.23(+0.5), 1.82m, 13.31m, 26.63(+0.6), 5.75m(-1.8), 45.98m)

External links 
 
 Jane Jamieson at Australian Athletics Historical Results

1975 births
Living people
Australian heptathletes
Athletes (track and field) at the 1996 Summer Olympics
Athletes (track and field) at the 1998 Commonwealth Games
Athletes (track and field) at the 2000 Summer Olympics
Athletes (track and field) at the 2002 Commonwealth Games
Athletes (track and field) at the 2006 Commonwealth Games
Commonwealth Games gold medallists for Australia
Commonwealth Games silver medallists for Australia
Olympic athletes of Australia
Commonwealth Games medallists in athletics
Universiade medalists in athletics (track and field)
Universiade gold medalists for Australia
Medalists at the 1995 Summer Universiade
Medalists at the 2001 Summer Universiade
Medalists at the 2003 Summer Universiade
Medallists at the 1998 Commonwealth Games
Medallists at the 2002 Commonwealth Games